Cymothoe magnus is a butterfly in the family Nymphalidae. It is found in the north-eastern part of the Democratic Republic of the Congo.

References

Butterflies described in 1928
Cymothoe (butterfly)
Endemic fauna of the Democratic Republic of the Congo
Butterflies of Africa